Southern Pacific Railroad (SP) number 1518 is an EMD SD7, and was the first ever SD series diesel locomotive, originally built in May 1951 as General Motors Electro-Motive Division's (EMD) prototype Demonstrator #990. Its road number 990 was in reference to EMD Engineering Department's project number 15990. It successfully completed numerous demonstration tours for EMD on several railroads before being completely overhauled and subsequently sold to Southern Pacific.  

During this overhaul at EMD's LaGrange, IL shops, the prime mover and electrical cabinet were refurbished and new wheelsets were installed.
When 5308 was delivered to SP shortly thereafter, it was slightly different from all other SD7s in that it was their only SD7 to have dual control stands, a winterization hatch over its forward fan (a rare, early feature for SP at that time, but not entirely unbeknownst to them: several of their F7s and the odd GP20 also had them), and two single-bell Leslie A-200 horns mounted directly behind the cab atop the roof of the long hood. Upon delivery, SP added a steam generator inside the short hood, a new radio, and a large "ashcan" signal light on the front of the short hood. As a result of its uniqueness, SP classified 5308 into its own single-unit class, DF-116. SP 5308 entered service at Ogden, UT, and was immediately sent to work on SP subsidiary Northwestern Pacific Railroad alongside SP's other SD7s on 10/23/52, less than two full weeks after ownership had transferred from EMD to SP.

In the mid-1950s, SP repainted it in a modification of their famous "Black Widow" paint scheme, adding wings at both ends, signifying dual control stands. It is the SP's only SD7 to ever have feathers painted as such. Around 1959, SP's ubiquitous scarlet and grey "Bloody Nose" scheme was applied, which remains to the current day. 

In 1965, 1518 was renumbered, becoming 2715. In the late 60s, the "ashcan" signal light was replaced with a Pyle National sealed-beam Gyralight package.

In 1970, 2715 was repainted without its rear wings but still retained its dual control stands. Sometime between 1970 and 1974, its steam generator and water tank were removed, and in 1974, it was renumbered to 1415. The May 1, 1975, SP roster designates 1415 as a Class ES615-2. By that date, the two Leslie A-200s were replaced with a Nathan P3 (right side) and an M5 (left side).

By the 1980s, SP, like many roads, had to decide whether to scrap its first-generation power or rebuild it. Based on the success of the IC's and Santa Fe's rebuild programs, the SP sent its SD7s through the GRIP (General Rehabilitation and Improvement Program) process in its Sacramento shops. The locomotives were stripped to the frame and came out virtually as new units. Whatever hadn't been changed on 1415 during previous maintenance work was lost during the upgrade to an SD7R. The unit received a reconditioned 16-567C block (modified to receive 645E liners, making it a 16-645CE), all-new electrical components and controls upgraded to Dash-2 standards, new traction motors, a full light package on both ends, and a modernized carbody with a slight hump behind the cab for the new electrical equipment. Gone were the dual controls, the winterization hatch, the Nathan horns, and dual fuel tanks. The dynamic brake blister remained, but the grids were internally disconnected. It emerged from the shops as SD7R 1518. 

SP got its money's worth, for 1518 served another 17 years before finally being sidelined in Los Angeles with mechanical issues. Fortunately, when the UP and SP merged, UP recognized the historical significance of the locomotive and moved to the UP's heritage program roundhouse in Cheyenne, Wyoming, to be preserved. After spending time in storage, Southern Pacific 1518 was donated in April 2003 to the Illinois Railway Museum where it currently resides.

1518 had not been started since its sidelining in 1997, but a few days after it arrived at IRM, the diesel team got her running. 1518 has been in operation since then and was running in the 2016 Diesel Days Parade of Power. 1518 again participated in 2017 and 2018 and has since been occasionally seen on the museum's Showcase Weekend special event.

References 

         Illinois Railway Museum. "IRM Roster-Southern Pacific 1518." https://www.irm.org/cgi-bin/rsearch.cgi?diesel=Southern+Pacific=1518 Accessed 13 July 2022

         Alberston, Bob. "EMD SD7-SP 1518, A precursor to all engines on rails today." Rail & Wire, Spring 2019.

Electro-Motive Division locomotives
1518
C-C locomotives
Individual locomotives of the United States
Railway locomotives introduced in 1952
Preserved diesel locomotives
Diesel-electric locomotives of the United States
Standard gauge locomotives of the United States